Grindu is a commune located in Ialomița County, Muntenia, Romania. It is composed of a single village, Grindu.

References

Communes in Ialomița County
Localities in Muntenia